Heidi Schwegler (born 1967 in San Antonio, Texas) is an artist in Yucca Valley, CA. She is the founder of the Yucca Valley Material Lab, a space for thinking and making. From 2015-2018 she was the Chair of the Masters in Fine Arts Program in Applied Craft and Design, a program jointly offered by Pacific Northwest College of Art and Oregon College of Art and Craft. Schwegler has been included in the 2018 Bellevue Art Museum Biennial, Portland2016 Biennial, the Portland2010 Biennial, and the Oregon Biennial in 1999.

In interviews, Schwegler has expressed "an affinity for the ruin, non-sites and discarded objects". Schwegler calls herself "an urban archaeologist" who prefers "to mine the peripheral ruin, the discarded stuff that is ignored and considered worthless. By reassigning the value and purpose of something recognizable, I emphasize the perforation between what it was and what it has now become." Pulling from the traditions of craft and conceptual art, Schwegler uses a variety of mediums, including glass, metal, sculpture, photography, and installation.

Schwegler is represented by UPFOR Gallery in Portland, Oregon and Asphodel in New York, NY.

Education 
Schwegler received her BFAs in Art History and Metals from the University of Kansas and her MFA from the University of Oregon.

Selected solo exhibitions
 On Gurgling, William Benington Gallery, London, 2018
 My Enemy, Asphodel, New York, NY, 2017
 Extinction Anxiety, Upfor Gallery, Portland, Oregon, 2017
 Botched Execution, The Art Gym, Marylhurst University, 2015
 Uncommon Likeness: Identity in Flux, Sheldon Museum of Art, NE, 2016
 Wrest_01, Gray Box, University of Oregon, Portland, Oregon, 2015
 Lunch, Soil Gallery, Seattle, Washington, 2015

Selected group exhibitions
 The future has no presence, Asphodel, New York, NY 2018
 Teeth and Consequence, Private Places, Portland, Oregon 2018
 Portland2016 Biennial, Disjecta, Portland, Oregon, 2016
 November's Bone, Halsey McKay Gallery, New York, NY, 2016
 Portland2010 Biennial, Disjecta, Portland, Oregon, 2010
 Oregon Biennial, Portland Art Museum, 1999
 April Meetings New Media Festival, Belgrade, Serbia, 2014
 Group Show, Mas Attack Series, Torrance Art Museum, California, 2014
 Hallie Ford Fellows Group Show, Museum of Contemporary Craft, Portland, Oregon, 2013
 Imposter’, RAID Projects, Los Angeles, California, 2011

Awards
 Yaddo Residency, 2016
 MacDowell Colony Fellowship, 2010, 2018
 Artist Fellowship, Oregon Arts Commission (2010, 2018)
 Project Grant, Regional Arts and Culture Council (2007, 2010, 2013, 2015, 2018)
 Career Opportunity Grant, Oregon Arts Commission (2010, 2013, 2014, 2016, 2018)
 Klaus Moje Award 2017
 Emergency Grant, Foundation for Contemporary Arts, NY 2016
 Hallie Ford Fellowship, 2010
 Finalist, Contemporary NW Art Awards, Portland Museum, 2010

References

External links
Peripheral Ruin, An Interview with Heidi Schwegler, Drain, Vol 11:2, 2014

1967 births
Living people
Artists from Portland, Oregon
Pacific Northwest College of Art faculty
University of Kansas alumni
University of Oregon alumni
People from San Antonio
Artists from Texas
20th-century American artists
20th-century American women artists
21st-century American artists
21st-century American women artists
American women academics